Tower houses appeared on the Islands of Ireland and Great Britain starting from the High Middle Ages. They were constructed in the wilder parts of Great Britain and Ireland, particularly in Scotland, and throughout Ireland, until at least up to the 17th century. The remains of such structures are dotted around the Irish and Scottish countryside, with a particular concentration in the Scottish Borders where they include peel towers and bastle houses. Some are still intact and even inhabited today, while others stand as ruined shells.

Scottish tower houses

Tower houses are often called castles, and despite their characteristic compact footprint size, they are formidable habitations and there is no clear distinction between a castle and a tower house. In Scotland a classification system has been widely accepted based on ground plan, such as the L-plan castle style, one example being the original layout (prior to enlargement) of Muchalls Castle in Scotland.

The few surviving round Scottish Iron Age towers known as brochs are often compared to tower houses, having mural passages and a basebatter, (a thickening of the wall that slopes obliquely, intended to prevent the use of a battering ram) although the entrances to Brochs are far less ostentatious.

Irish tower houses

Irish archaeologist Tom Finan has stated that while the precise origins of the Irish tower house is "shady", he makes the case that "the Irish hall house is in fact the parent of the Irish tower house". Tadhg O'Keefe has stressed that there remain issues over the use of terms halls, 'hall-houses', and 'tower-houses' have become needlessly entangled and argues for a clearer understanding of the terms, and where they apply. While archaeologist Thomas Johnson Westropp preferred the term 'peel houses' for these type of fortified residences, the term 'tower house' became more widely used from the early 20th century, with the work and publications of architect and antiquarian Harold Graham Leask.

Whether an evolution of an earlier form or otherwise, many tower houses were built in Ireland between the early 15th and 17th centuries, with over two thousand tower houses remaining extant. After 1500, many lords built fortified houses, although the introduction of cannons slowly rendered such defenses increasingly obsolete. It is possible many were built after King Henry VI of England introduced a building subsidy of £10 in 1429 to every man in the Pale who wished to build a castle within 10 years(Statute Rolls of the Parliament of Ireland, Reign of Henry VI, pp 33–5). However recent studies have undermined the significance of this grant, demonstrating that there were many similar grants at different times and in different areas, and because many were built in areas outside English control.

They were built by both the Anglo-Irish and Gaelic Irish, with some constructed by English and Scottish immigrants during successive conquests of Ireland between the 1570s and 1690s. Many were positioned within sight of each other and a system of visual communication is said to have been established between them, based on line of sight from the uppermost levels, although this may simply be a result of their high density. County Kilkenny has several examples of this arrangement such as Ballyshawnmore and Neigham. County Clare is known to have had approximately two hundred and thirty tower houses in the 17th century, some of which were later surveyed by the Irish antiquarian Thomas Johnson Westropp in the 1890s.

The Irish tower house was used for both defensive and residential reasons, with many lordly dynasties building them on their demesne lands in order to assert status and provide a residence for the senior lineage of the family. Many had a defensive wall around the building, known as a bawn.

See also
 Architecture in early modern Scotland#Vernacular architecture (section)
 Bawn
 Scottish Vernacular
 Vernacular architecture
 Welsh Tower houses

References

Further reading
 

 
 

ga:Caisleáin na hÉireann, 1350 - 1650